Robert I. Johnson is a former member of the Wisconsin State Assembly.

Biography
Johnson was born on May 24, 1928, in Mondovi, Wisconsin. He would attend the University of Wisconsin-Madison. During the Korean War, he served in the United States Army.

Political career
Johnson was elected to the Assembly in 1960 and was re-elected in 1964. He is a Republican.

References

1928 births
Living people
Republican Party members of the Wisconsin State Assembly
Military personnel from Wisconsin
United States Army soldiers
United States Army personnel of the Korean War
University of Wisconsin–Madison alumni
People from Mondovi, Wisconsin